Glenn Lamonte Goins (January 2, 1954 – July 29, 1978), also known as Glen Goins, was a singer and guitarist for Parliament-Funkadelic in the mid-1970s. Goins is a member of the Rock and Roll Hall of Fame, posthumously inducted in 1997 with fifteen other members of Parliament-Funkadelic. His first (known) recordings were as part of the group "The Bags".  They released a single in 1972: "It's Heavy" b/w "Don't Mess With My Baby".

Biography
Born and raised in Plainfield, New Jersey, in a family of talented musicians, Goins was a master vocalist with a strong, haunting and powerful gospel voice. He is perhaps best known for "calling in the Mothership" in the P-Funk live shows, such as on the renowned P-Funk Earth Tour.

Goins was particularly prominent on the Parliament albums Mothership Connection (1975), The Clones of Dr. Funkenstein (1976), and Funkentelechy Vs. the Placebo Syndrome (1977). He played on the Funkadelic albums of this period as well. He sang lead vocals on "Bop Gun (Endangered Species)" and the remake of "Fantasy is Reality".

In 1977, Goins was one of the first of many musicians to leave Parliament-Funkadelic in reaction to what was perceived as very bad management by band leader George Clinton. He formed his own funk band Quazar in 1978, featuring his younger brother Kevin Goins and drummer Jerome "Bigfoot" Brailey.

Glenn Goins died from Hodgkin's lymphoma, aged 24, in 1978.

Studio album
 Quazar, 1978 (with Quazar)

External links
 [ Allmusic guide entry for Glen Goins]
 Glenn Goins in discogs.com

1954 births
1978 deaths
Musicians from Plainfield, New Jersey
American funk singers
American funk guitarists
American male guitarists
P-Funk members
Singers from New Jersey
Deaths from Hodgkin lymphoma
20th-century American male singers
20th-century American singers
Guitarists from New Jersey
20th-century American guitarists
20th-century American male musicians